Bernard John DeViveiros (April 19, 1901 – July 5, 1994) was a Major League Baseball shortstop who played for the Chicago White Sox in  and the Detroit Tigers in .

In 1951, DeViveiros wrote  a section on base running in The Sporting News publication How to Play Baseball."

Sources
Lodi News-Sentinel - Apr 15, 1954: Newspaper article citing Bernie's efforts to teach and demonstrate sliding and bunting, which he did for 70 years up and down the West Coast of the United States of America.
The Spokesman-Review - Feb 9, 1976: Newspaper article citing Bernie's commitment to teaching safe sliding techniques, like the bent-leg slide, and his never-ending fight against players like Daryl Strawberry.
Portland Tribune - January 31, 2008: Jack Dunn states in this newspaper article that Bernie deViveiros signed Mickey Lolich.

References

External links

1901 births
1994 deaths
Americus Pioneers players
Beaumont Exporters players
Baseball players from California
Calgary Bronchos players
Chicago White Sox players
Detroit Tigers players
Detroit Tigers scouts
Henryetta Hens players
Kalamazoo Celery Pickers players
Los Angeles Angels (minor league) players
Major League Baseball shortstops
Meridian Bears players
Minneapolis Millers (baseball) players
Mission Reds players
New Orleans Pelicans (baseball) players
Oakland Oaks (baseball) players
Sacramento Senators players
San Antonio Indians players
Shreveport Sports players
Spokane Hawks players
Wenatchee Chiefs players